Falsetto is the vocal register occupying the frequency range just above the modal voice register and overlapping with it by approximately one octave. It is commonly cited in the context of singing.

Falsetto may also refer to:

People and Animals 
 Falsetto (horse), an American Thoroughbred Champion racehorse

Music 
 Falsetto (song), the second single from The-Dream's debut studio album
 Falsetto Keeps Time, the first EP released by The Promise Ring
 Falsettos, a musical consisting of:
 March of the Falsettos, a musical
 Falsettoland, a musical with a book by James Lapine and music and lyrics by William Finn

Other 
 The Scottish Falsetto Sock Puppet Theatre, a comedy act that began in the UK
 Falsetto, a character in the 2007 Xbox 360 and 2008 PlayStation 3 game Eternal Sonata
 Falsetto Jones, A villainous dog breeder from Kim Possible, named for his helium-affected voice.